The private choir school of the Vienna Woods Boys' Choir was a singing school for boys and girls in Maria Enzersdorf, south of Vienna, in the state of Lower Austria.

History
Vienna Woods Boys' Choir school was founded by Stanislaus Marusczyk, a missionary from the Society of the Divine Word, in Maria Enzersdorf in 1921. Initially, the choir mainly focused on music in the worship services and celebrations at the Missionshaus St. Gabriel, where the school was based. The choir soon began concert tours through Austria, and later to neighboring countries.

The choir dissolved in 2014.

External links 
  (archived on 2014-12-17)
 Sängerknaben vom Wienerwald (SvW) by Christian Fastl, Oesterreichisches Musiklexikon online, accessed on 2019-11-24

1921 establishments in Austria
Musical groups established in 1921
2014 disestablishments in Austria
Musical groups disestablished in 2014
Choirs of children
Austrian choirs
Choir schools